The plaza de Olavide is an octagonal plaza located in the heart of the Trafalgar neighborhood, in Madrid, Spain.

History 
In 1860, the plaza, hitherto known as "Plaza Industrial" was named Plaza de Olavide. By that time, most of the population of the slum of Chamberí lived around the place.

Under a project developed under the purview of the Second Republic's General Plan for Markets, Francisco Javier Ferrero was tasked with building an octagonal market in the place, replacing a previous and smaller one. The market underwent a controlled demolition in November 1974, in a move protested by the neighbors. The refurbished plaza, with new trees and an underground parking lot for 400 vehicles, was formally inaugurated in 1977.

References 

Plazas in Madrid
Chamberí